Little Big Shots (also known as Little Big Shots with Dawn French) is a British television talent show that premiered on ITV on 1 March 2017 and ended on 27 May 2018. The series is hosted by Dawn French and based on the American show of the same name created by Ellen DeGeneres and Steve Harvey who was also the host of the original. The series is produced by Wall to Wall. In June 2017, it was confirmed it would return for a second series, also with six episodes.

Format
The show, unlike shows such as The X Factor, has no judges, winners or losers. In each episode, Dawn French talks to a 3– to 13-year-old child about their talent, before the child performs it in front of a studio audience. Some talents shown include singing, dancing, cooking and karate.

Transmissions

Reception
Little Big Shots received mixed reviews. Viewers said that the show "lifted the spirit" and "[was a] ray of sunshine". Tim Dowling from The Guardian said "Little Big Shots appears to be the kind of cheap and cheerful fare designed to be broken into viral chunks and slapped up on YouTube afterwards: heartwarming moments from a sickly-sweet box of delights."

References

External links
 

2010s British children's television series
2017 British television series debuts
2018 British television series endings
ITV game shows
British variety television shows
British television series based on American television series
English-language television shows
Talent shows
Television series about children
Television series about teenagers
Television series by Warner Bros. Television Studios
2010s British reality television series